The 2017–18 Segunda División season, also known as LaLiga 1|2|3 for sponsorship reasons, was the 87th season of the Spanish football second division since its establishment.

Name
Previously named Liga Adelante, the competition was renamed LaLiga 1|2|3 ahead of the 2016–17 season, as a result of a three-year sponsorship agreement between the Liga de Fútbol Profesional and the banking group Banco Santander.

Team changes

Stadiums and locations

Personnel and sponsorship

Managerial changes

League table

Standings

Positions by round
The table lists the positions of teams after each week of matches. In order to preserve chronological evolvements, any postponed matches are not included to the round at which they were originally scheduled, but added to the full round they were played immediately afterwards. For example, if a match is scheduled for matchday 13, but then postponed and played between days 16 and 17, it will be added to the standings for day 16.

Source: BDFútbol

Results

Promotion play-offs

Teams placed between 3rd and 6th position (excluding reserve teams) took part in the promotion play-offs.

Season statistics

Top goalscorers

Top assists

Zamora Trophy
The Zamora Trophy was awarded by newspaper Marca to the goalkeeper with the least goals-to-games ratio. Keepers had to play at least 28 games of 60 or more minutes to be eligible for the trophy.

Hat-tricks

(H) – Home ; (A) – Away

Average attendances 
Attendances include play-off games.

Monthly awards

References

External links
La Liga website

 
2017-18
2
Spain